Cəndəhar (also, Çəndahar and Chandakhar) is a village in the Siazan Rayon of Azerbaijan.  The village forms part of the municipality of Zarat.

References 

Kaspi Newspaper

Populated places in Siyazan District